Gerry Burton (born 11 February 1933) is a former  Australian rules footballer who played with St Kilda in the Victorian Football League (VFL).

Notes

External links 

Living people
1933 births
Australian rules footballers from Western Australia
St Kilda Football Club players
East Perth Football Club players